The 2020 Barcelona FIA Formula 2 round was a pair of motor races for Formula 2 cars that took place on 15–16 August 2020 at the Circuit de Barcelona-Catalunya in Catalonia, Spain as part of the FIA Formula 2 Championship. It was the sixth round of the 2020 FIA Formula 2 Championship and ran in support of the 2020 Spanish Grand Prix.

It was the first time since 2018 where one team secured a double lock-up in terms of wins in both races as Dutch outfit MP Motorsport managed to win both the Feature Race and Sprint Race with Nobuharu Matsushita and Felipe Drugovich respectively. The last team doing that was ART Grand Prix, coincidentally at the same venue.

Report
Callum Ilott continued to score poles, outpacing Robert Shwartzman in the Barcelona Qualifying. Nobuharu Matsushita was the only driver who had a pit-stop during the safety car period after Sean Gelael and Giuliano Alesi tangled. It helped Matsushita to achieve win after start from the 18th on the grid, which as 2020 Barcelona Formula 2 round is the farthest starting position to take a race win in the history of FIA Formula 2 Championship, while Shwartzman and Guanyu Zhou completed the podium. Gelael was injured after collision with Jack Aitken on the final lap, resulting his missing in the sprint race and the four further race weekends.

Ilott wasn't able again to convert pole into the race victory in the sprint race. While Matsushita's teammate Felipe Drugovich won the race ahead of Luca Ghiotto and Mick Schumacher.

Classification

Qualifying

Feature race 

Note：
 – Nikita Mazepin originally finished in third place, but was given a five-second time penalty for failing to bypass the bollard at Turn 1, and finally ranked 13th.
† – Jack Aitken and Sean Gelael collided on the final lap, but were classified as they completed over 90% of the race distance.

Sprint race 

Note：
 - Christian Lundgaard originally finished the race in eighth place, but because of an illegal overtake against Callum Ilott, he was given a five-second time penalty and finally ranked 11th.
 - Sean Gelael was declared unfit for the Sprint Race after an accident in the Feature Race with Jack Aitken, where he suffered a fracture of a vertebra. He was then subsequently ruled out for the following four rounds.

Standings after the event

Drivers' Championship standings

Teams' Championship standings

 Note: Only the top five positions are included for both sets of standings.

See also 
2020 Spanish Grand Prix
2020 Barcelona Formula 3 round

References

External links 
 

Barcelona
Barcelona
Auto races in Spain
Barcelona Formula 2 round